Hicham El Majhad (born 9 April 1991) is a Moroccan footballer who plays as a goalkeeper for Hassania Agadir.

Career statistics

Honours

Club
Ittihad Tanger
Botola: 2017–18

References

1991 births
Living people
Moroccan footballers
People from Agadir
Association football goalkeepers
Ittihad Tanger players
Botola players
2020 African Nations Championship players
Morocco A' international footballers